St John's Matriculation Higher Secondary School is a school in Alwarthirunagar which had its beginnings in the early 1980s. The school was founded by D John Ponnudurai. This school is part of IYAP consortium. The school follows Matriculation Syllabus for students between Grade 1 to Grade 10 and Tamil Nadu State Board for grades Eleven and Twelve. It has branches in Porur, Triplicane and a sister school in the name of the Good Shepherd in Alwarthirunagar. The medium of education is English with Tamil, Hindi and French as second languages.

The school has three floors with the top floor being thatched. It has a creche and more classrooms across the street. The competition comes from Balalok, Avichi and A V Meiyappan. The school uses the R K Ground nearby for games and sports.

Infrastructure and facilities

The main building was constructed in 1984. The school has laboratories for Physics, Chemistry and Biology. The school has a small playground, but for a larger playground students go to the Ramakrishna Nagar Ground. Transportation such as bus, van and cycle rickshaw are provided at additional charge.

The school runs Project Day where the students do experimental and art preparations which are displayed in the school. The students display and explain to the visitors. This is financed by students themselves; some teachers also provide finance.

The school celebrates Annual Day where students perform dance or sing songs on the stage and awards are given to first, second rank holders and most disciplined student by a guest. The most disciplined student is selected by a class teacher. Previous guests have been celebrities like Vijayakant. A souvenir is provided to the students which contains the pictures of first, second and third rank holders and also contains articles and poems composed by the school students.

Students who fail in subjects are given coaching classes, where they stay after normal timings and study.

Teachers
The class teacher does management activities such as attendance, exam reports management, complaints handling and resolution, and parent-teacher meets. Some class teachers teach all the subjects for the lower grade classes. Mostly, subjects such as English and Moral Science are taught by the class teachers.

Staff
Principal/Founder/Chairman: Dr. John Ponnudurai(Late)
Principal: Mr. Vinod Diraviyaraj(s/o Dr. John Ponnudurai)
Head Master/Mistress/Vice Principal: Ms. Manoranjitham Wilfred, Ms.Ambika Suresh, followed by N Francis, who was followed by Mrs.Rama.

Uniform history

The first uniform was checked tops with half centimetre white and brown check boxes and chocolate pants till 1983. In 1984 it was cream coloured shirt and chocolate pants. During 1985 it changed to a lighter shade of chocolate shirt and chocolate pants with black shoes. On Mondays the uniform was white tops, white pants and white shoes.

Since the start of the school the tie had been brown. In the 1980s, the tie design changed to half centimetre coloured stripes of cream and chocolate.

The girls wear shirt and skirt till VII standard and Salwar Kameez from VIII standard. For boys its half pant and shirt till VII standard and full pants from VIII standard. The school provides belts with the school logo and four coloured (blue, green, red and yellow) groupings or houses. Wearing them was mandatory till 1986. The school uniform, badge, tie, belt and shoes were mandatory and were inspected when the students were returning from prayer to classroom. The lady teachers wore a green saree on Mondays.

School day
The school starts with Christian prayers and song at 8:45 am and closes with the prayer, song and Indian National Anthem at 3:45 pm. Each period is 40 minutes, at the end of which a bell is rung. There are eight periods in a day, with half an hour lunch from 12:00 noon to 12.30 pm. Morning session is for three hours with a 15 minutes break. The prayers include a Christian prayer, a pledge, news reading and on Mondays, a Flag Hoisting is done by the school principal.

Daily the students write their home work in the school diary. and the teachers sign it. The students do their homework and get it signed from their parents. This is checked by the teacher the next morning. Since it is a Christian school, they have one extra subject called Moral Science which is taught by the class teacher.

Other details
The school conducts a parent-teacher meeting day quarterly. Speech programs are run to increase the speech skills of the students. Quiz competitions are also conducted.

 Competition 
The schools which are in competition with the school are the matriculation schools in the vicinity – Balalok, AV Meiyappan.

Tuition centres to which the students can go are primarily Namadurai Coaching centre (Sri Krishna Institute of Individuality development (SKIID)), Devi Institute of Mathematics (DIM) and KD CN Tuition centre. The students of X and XII students go to tuition centres for additional revisions of the syllabus.

This school has a good record of getting 100% first class in the board exams. The students who do not get good marks in school exams are sent to the Triplicane branch of this school before X and XII board exams.

Syllabus
The school has Matriculation syllabus till X standard and State Board from XI standard with English Medium. The science subject is split into Physics, Chemistry, Botany and Zoology in VI standard. Maths is split into Maths I and II in VIII standard. English and Hindi are split into I and II parts. There are practicals in Biology, Physics and Chemistry which involves doing experiments in the Laboratory.

Groups during XI and XII standard are:
 I Group – Maths, Physics, Chemistry, Biology, English and Second Language (Hindi or Tamil or French)
 II Group – Physics, Chemistry, computer science, English and Second Language (Hindi or Tamil or French)(primarily Maths is absent and Botany and Zoology are present instead)
 III Group – Maths, Physics, Chemistry, Computer Science, English and Second Language (Hindi or Tamil or French)(Science, Maths and Computer Science are primary subjects)
 IV Group-Commerce, Accountancy, Economics, English and Second Language (Hindi or Tamil or French)(not a Science group'').

French is considered to be a scoring subject in comparison to Hindi and Tamil. Moral Science is a standard subject till IXth standard.

The exams are I Mid Term, Quarterly, II Mid Term, Half yearly, III Mid term and Annual exam in order. For Xth and XIIth the additional exams there are three revision tests before the board exams. 10-day study leave is provided before the board exams.

Leadership roles to students
The most basic form of leadership role given to students is the assignment of a Class Leadership role. The Class Leader manages silence in the class, and sees that the things essential to the class such as board duster and chalk are available.

Other leadership roles that are for students in the senior grades:
School people leader role is given to the student from the XIIth Grade. This role requires good capability in sports as well, because Sports day activities are taken care of by this leader. The daily prayer management and instructions are handled by this role.
Assistant School people leader is given to the students in the XIth Grade. The student will be the next School People leader role the following year. This role also takes care in case the School people leader is absent.
The house Leaders: The students are split into four groups called golden hawks[yellow], jaguar[blue], Gladiators[green] and knights[red] for competing in sports and also for the Sports day. Each house has a leader. This candidate needs to be good in Sports.

Apart from the school syllabus, activities include competing with other schools. Mostly these are quizzes, Speech, Project exhibitions and competitive exams.

Notable alumni
 Ekambaram, Tippu is a popular singer. 1995 batch
 Music Directors Srikanth Deva and Bobo Shashi at 'Shashi Kanth' who composed music for Kulir 100 Degrees.
 Actor Dhanush known as Venkatesh Prabhu by then (his real name) studied XI and XII from 1999–2001.
 Director Arun Prabhu Purushothaman (Aruvi)

Gallery

References 
 

Christian schools in Tamil Nadu
Primary schools in Tamil Nadu
High schools and secondary schools in Chennai